Therea petiveriana, variously called the desert cockroach, seven-spotted cockroach, or Indian domino cockroach, is a species of crepuscular cockroach found in India and Sri Lanka. They are members of a basal group within the cockroaches. This somewhat roundish and contrastingly marked cockroach is mainly found on the ground in scrub forest habitats where they may burrow under leaf litter or loose soil during the heat of the day.

Description

The black and white pattern of adults is believed to have evolved to mimic the pattern of the aggressive ground beetle Anthia sexguttata that has strong defenses, including the ability to spray chemical irritants. The upperside of the abdomen is orange-yellow, but is hidden by the tegmina. The spots on the asymmetrical tegmina are placed so that when closed, the spots appear symmetrical. The right tegmen lobe is bright orange-yellow. The species has been said to be one of the few cockroaches with "grace and beauty". The head is bent back underneath the pronotal shield (hypognathous) and the ocelli (simple eyes) face forward, helping sense light and thereby time, and they forage actively during early morning and late evening.

Reproduction
Once a female has copulated with a male, she does not allow other males to approach, kicking them away with her hind legs. The eggs are laid in leaf litter. Up to 13 oothecae are produced by a female over 3 to 40 days (blocking the ocelli of the females has been found to inhibit the laying of eggs). The oothecae are produced as in other cockroaches by the secretions from the asymmetrical colleterial glands of the females. Once the ootheca is extruded it is deposited in suitably moist leaf litter. Nymphs lead a life hidden below the ground and may go as deep as 30 cm during the dry season.

Taxonomy
This is the type species for the genus Therea.  The species epithet is after James Petiver (1663–1718), who obtained specimens from southern India and Sri Lanka (probably from the surgeon at Fort St. George, either Samuel Browne or more likely Edward Bulkley). Carl Linnaeus placed the species under Cassida and described C. petiveriana and another that he called C. septemguttata, now considered a synonym.

Communication
Like other cockroaches, T. petiveriana uses chemical pheromones to communicate with each other. When disturbed, they are said to raise their wings and evert lateral glands on the second and third abdominal segments. Their glandular secretions were found to contain volatile compounds N-3-methylbutylacetamide (MBA) and N-3-methylbutylpropanamide (MBP), making up nearly 60% of the volatile fraction. These chemicals appeared to induce alarm behaviour.

Digestion
Like termites, these cockroaches have symbiotic flagellates and bacteria in their gut that aid in digestion.

As pets
This species is popular as a pet in many parts of the world and is easy to keep.

References

Insects of India
Insects described in 1758
Taxa named by Carl Linnaeus
Cockroaches